R. Andrew Bassford is a brigadier general in the United States Army Reserve and Deputy Commander of the 88th Regional Support Command at Fort McCoy, Wisconsin.

Career
Bassford originally joined the United States Army in 1986. The following year, he completed the Basic, Airborne and Ranger Courses at the United States Army Infantry School and was assigned to the 7th Infantry Division in Germany. Later, he joined the 325th Airborne Infantry Regiment.

In 1998, Bassford transferred to the Army Reserve and was assigned to the 80th Division. Later, he became a battalion commander with the 317th Infantry Regiment and a brigade commander with the 98th Division. In 2013, Bassford was Chief of Staff of the 108th Training Command (Initial Entry Training). He was promoted to the rank of brigadier general in 2014.

Awards he has received include the Meritorious Service Medal, the Army Commendation Medal and the Army Achievement Medal. In addition, he is authorized to wear the Ranger tab, the Senior Parachutist Badge and the Expert Infantryman Badge.

Education
Georgetown University
University of Virginia School of Law
United States Army Infantry School
United States Army War College
United States Army Jumpmaster School
United States Army Command and General Staff College

References

United States Army generals
United States Army Rangers
United States Army reservists
Georgetown University alumni
University of Virginia School of Law alumni
United States Army War College alumni
United States Army Command and General Staff College alumni
Living people
Year of birth missing (living people)